Wilson Brown (August 27, 1804 – August 27, 1855) was an American politician. He was the Lieutenant Governor of Missouri from 1853 until his death in office in 1855. He also served in the Missouri House of Representatives from 1838 to 1839.

References

1804 births
1855 deaths
Lieutenant Governors of Missouri
Democratic Party members of the Missouri House of Representatives
19th-century American politicians